Karel Kovář (born 10 December 1942) is a Czech rower. He competed in the men's coxed pair event at the 1968 Summer Olympics.

References

1942 births
Living people
Czech male rowers
Olympic rowers of Czechoslovakia
Rowers at the 1968 Summer Olympics
Sportspeople from Třebíč